The 1996–97 Santosh Trophy, also known as the Bharat Petroleum Santosh Trophy for sponsorship reasons, was the 53rd edition of the Santosh Trophy, the main State competition for football in India. It was held from 8 to 19 January 1997 in Jabalpur, Madhya Pradesh. In the final, Bengal beat Goa 1–0 in a repeat of the previous edition's final.

Group stage

Group A

Group B

Knockout stage

Semi-finals

Final

References

External links 
 

1996–97 in Indian football
Santosh Trophy seasons